

The following lists events that happened during 1973 in Afghanistan.

Incumbents
 Monarch: Mohammed Zahir Shah (until 17 July)
 President: Mohammed Daoud Khan (starting 17 July)
 Prime Minister: Mohammad Musa Shafiq (until 17 July)

Beginning of 1973
Afghanistan's internal situation is dominated by difficulties arising from three successive seasons of drought in the central and northern areas of the country. In Ghor province, the shortage is particularly bad; famine is widespread and there are many deaths from starvation. Although massive Soviet and U.S. aid programs, supplemented by less ambitious efforts sponsored by China, Britain, France, India, and other countries, have done much to improve roads, power supplies, irrigation, and other essential elements of an economic substructure on which future progress could be based, the gap that divides Kabul from the outlying and backward areas shows little signs of closing. In those parts of the country the authority of the central government remains minimal, and small notice is taken of the men selected for parliament. Thus, the capital tends to be a world of its own, where governments change, where unrest is chronic, and where the country finds almost its only link with the outside world.

July 1973
King Zahir Shah, whose personality has for many years ensured an element of continuity, absents himself in Italy for eye treatment. While he is out of the country, on July 17, Daoud Khan, who has long resented his exclusion from power, takes advantage of some discontent over promotions in the armed forces, along with student unrest and resentment among the educated classes against unemployment, to depose the king in a virtually bloodless coup. The King's forty-year reign was ended within a matter of minutes. Leftist military officers and civil servants of the Parcham faction, including the Air Force colonel Abdul Qadir, assist in the overthrow. Daud Khan abolishes the constitution of 1964 and establishes the Republic of Afghanistan with himself as president as well as foreign minister. He announces his adherence to Afghanistan's traditional policy of nonalignment, but is an acknowledged friend of the Soviet Union and a firm supporter of secessionist movements in the Pashto-speaking areas of Pakistan, the North-West Frontier Province and Balochistan - an outlook that seems likely to revive the friction with Pakistan that marked his earlier period of power. Zahir Shah formally abdicates on August 24, and remains in exile in Italy. Daud Khan attempts to introduce socioeconomic reforms, but gradually moves away from the socialist ideals his regime initially espoused.

September 20, 1973
Radio Kabul announces the discovery of an allegedly Pakistan-backed plot to overthrow the new regime. A number of civilians and high-ranking military personalities are arrested, including former Prime Minister Mohammad Hashim Maiwandwal, who is later reported to have hanged himself on October 1 while awaiting trial. Five defendants are subsequently condemned to death and executed on December 25, while others receive long terms of imprisonment. A second attempted coup is foiled in December. The Kabul press accuses Pakistan of fomenting these conspiracies, but no solid evidence for the accusation is forthcoming. In view of Pakistani Prime Minister Zulfikar Ali Bhutto's desire for friendly relations with Afghanistan, it seems more likely that the conspiracies were the products of domestic discontent.

 
Afghanistan
Years of the 20th century in Afghanistan
Afghanistan
1970s in Afghanistan